Borohrádek is a town in Rychnov nad Kněžnou District in the Hradec Králové Region of the Czech Republic. It has about 2,100 inhabitants.

Administrative parts
The village of Šachov is an administrative part of Borohrádek.

Geography
It lies in the Orlice Table. The town is situated on the left bank of the Tichá Orlice River.

History
The first written mention of Borohrádek is from 1342. In 1971, it gained the town status.

References

External links

 

Cities and towns in the Czech Republic
Populated places in Rychnov nad Kněžnou District